Partisans in the Baltic States may refer to:

 Forest Brothers, anti-Soviet partisan groups active in the Baltics 1944-1956
 Soviet partisans,  pro-Soviet partisan groups active in German-occupied territories including the Baltic region during World War II

See also
Jewish partisans, anti-Nazi partisan groups active in Lithuania, among other regions, during World War II